Xuân Quỳnh (6 October 1942 – 29 August 1988) was a Vietnamese famous modern female poet. She, her husband Lưu Quang Vũ, and their 12-year-old son Lưu Quỳnh Thơ died in a car accident in Hải Dương city on 29 August 1988.

On 6 October 2019, she was honored with a Google Doodle.

References

Vietnamese women poets
1942 births
1988 deaths
20th-century Vietnamese poets
Road incident deaths in Vietnam
20th-century Vietnamese women writers
People from Hanoi